Urne may refer to:

People
 Christoffer Urne (1593–1663), Danish civil servant
 Jørgen Knudsen Urne (1598–1642), Danish nobleman
 Renate Urne (born 1982), Norwegian handball player

Places
 Urne, Wisconsin, United States

See also
 Urnes (disambiguation)